Werner Knudsen (born 23 October 1953) in Ringsted) is a Danish computer scientist, composer and author of both choral music and IT books. He is an IT architect at IBM and used to work at TDC A/S. He lives in Glostrup close to Copenhagen.

Parallel to his IT career he has always worked with music, in particular choir singing. For a number of years he was chairman of the Children's choir of the Royal Danish Academy of Music for which he has arranged some music. He is also a member of Akademisk Kor, a Copenhagen-based oratorio choir.

He has primarily composed songs as well as choral and organ music, notably in collaboration with author Niels Johansen. Hvem kaldte på erantis?, a collection of their songs and hymns, was published at Unitas Forlag in 2010. His Sommersange, a choral cycle with lyrics by Thøger Larsen, has been published at Edition S in 2008.

Works 

IT Books
 1995: Internet for alle
 1997: Mere Internet for alle
 1999: Internet tips for alle
 2001: Den lille bog om søgning på nettet

Music Works:
 2006: Sommersange (lyrics by Thøger Larsen)
 2007: Du danske sommer, jeg elsker dig (lyrics by Thøger Larsen)
 2010: Hvem kaldte på erantis? (lyrics by Niels Johansen)

See also
List of Danish composers

References

This article was initially translated from the Danish Wikipedia.

External links 
 Hvem kaldte på Erantis? (2010)
 Sommersange (2006)
 Sange, salmer og viser
 Edition S
 Unitas Forlag

Danish composers
Male composers
1953 births
Living people
People from Ringsted
People from Glostrup Municipality